Houdini is a UCI chess engine developed by Belgian programmer Robert Houdart. It is influenced by open-source engines IPPOLIT/RobboLito, Stockfish, and Crafty. Versions up to 1.5a are available for non-commercial use, while 2.0 and later are commercial only.

Playing style
Chess commentator and video annotator CM Tryfon Gavriel compared Houdini's playing style to that of the Romantic Era of chess, where an attacking, sacrificial style was predominant. According to Robert Houdart, Houdini's advantage against other top engines is in its handling of piece mobility, which is why it "favors aggressive play that tries to win the game".

Version history

The latest stable release of Houdini comes in two versions: Houdini 6 Standard and Houdini 6 Pro. Houdini 6 Pro supports up to 128 processor cores, 128 GB of RAM (hash) and is NUMA-aware, Houdini 5 Standard only supports up to 8 processor cores, 4 GB of hash and is not NUMA-aware. As with many other  UCI engines, Houdini comes with no GUI, so a chess GUI is needed for running the engine. Houdini 5 uses calibrated evaluations in which engine scores correlate directly with the win expectancy in the position.

Controversies
Houdini has had a history of allegations against it that it contains code from other engines. 

Houdini 1.0 has been alleged to be an IPPOLIT derivative, and to have plagiarized from Rybka, which initially lead to Houdini 1.0 to not be tested in any rating lists such as CCRL and CEGT.

Houdini 5.0 and Houdini 6.0 have been alleged to be Stockfish 8 derivatives without providing the sources on request, and thus, violating the GPL license. This has resulted in TCEC revoking Houdini's championship results, and disallowing Houdini from competing. Leaked source code has seemingly been shown to produce almost identical play to Houdini 5.0 and Houdini 6.0, while containing direct references to Stockfish in the code documentation.

On 20 July 2021, the Stockfish team announced legal action against ChessBase alleging that Houdini 6 and Fat Fritz 2 were in violation of the GNU General Public License license. As part of the settlement agreement, ChessBase has conceded the allegations.

Houdini 6.0 is also no longer available on ChessBase's website due to it being a Stockfish derivative.

Competition results
Houdini used to be one of the most successful engines in TCEC, with three championship wins to date, but since season 18 it no longer participates in TCEC due to it plagiarized code (see Controversies).

Notable games
 TCEC Houdini - Rybka Match 2011  ·  Queen Pawn Game: London System (D02)  ·  1–0 Houdini plays a pawn sacrifice on move 43.

References

External links 
 
 Interview with Houdart about the genesis and strengths of his program

Chess engines
2010 software